The Cambridge Advanced Learner's Dictionary (abbreviated CALD) was first published in 1995 under the name Cambridge International Dictionary of English, by the Cambridge University Press. The dictionary has over 140,000 words, phrases, and meanings. It is suitable for learners at CEF levels B2-C2.

The Cambridge Dictionary Word of the Year, by Cambridge University Press & Assessment, has been published every year since 2015.  The Cambridge Word of the Year is led by the data - what users look up - in the world's most popular dictionary for English language learners. . In 2022, the Cambridge Word of the Year was 'homer', caused by Wordle players looking up five-letter words, especially those that non-American players were less familiar with.  In 2021, the Cambridge Dictionary Word of the Year was 'perseverance'. In 2020, 'quarantine'.

Editions
First edition first published in 2003.
Second edition first published in 2005.
Third edition first published in 2008.
Fourth edition first published in 2013.

See also
Advanced learner's dictionary

References 

English dictionaries
Online English dictionaries
Cambridge University Press books